was a Japanese female soprano chanteuse and popular music (ryūkōka) singer. She was dubbed the "Queen of Blues" in Japan.

Life and career 
She was the oldest daughter of a wealthy merchant, whose business went bankrupt while his daughter was in her teenage years. In 1910, her family's home was destroyed in the Aomori City fire. In 1923 she, along with her mother and younger sister, went to Tokyo. There, she was admitted to the piano department of a music school. Later, her disposition towards singing was discovered and she was admitted to the vocal department. With the aim of becoming an opera singer, she made an extensive study of classical music. However, due to her family's poverty, she was forced to leave school for a year and worked as a nude model. Eventually, she returned to the music academy, and graduated top of her class in 1929.

She became a classical singer. However, she soon began to sing popular songs because the salary of a classical music performer was very low. Her 1937 song  became a hit. In 1938, she also released  . In Taiwan, the song was later given the alternative title "Han Yu Qu" (寒雨曲). In 1939, she recorded the song  as an insert song of the movie Tokyo no Josei, in which Setsuko Hara played the main role. However, the song was banned by Japanese authorities.

Awaya had a daughter outside marriage. In her old age, she criticized enka. She also criticized Hideki Saijo and Seiko Matsuda because Saijo enjoyed dancing and Matsuda sang songs without feeling. She said that songs without pain, distress and effort were frauds. Kenichi Mikawa respected her. In 1996, Awaya gave Mikawa her song "Rainy Blues" at her final live performance. She was elected an honorary citizen by her hometown Aomori City in 1998 and died in 1999.

In 2007, Hideaki Tokunaga covered Awaya's song "Farewell Blues" at a concert.

The use of the term 'blues' in some song titles is misleading; as the songs bear no resemblance to western blues.   Instead, they referred to slow melancholic songs, known commonly in Japan as kayōkyoku.

Discography

Singles 
  : 1929
 Love Parade : 1930
 Veny Ven : 1934
 Dona Marriquita : 1935
 Poema : 1935
 Barcelona : 1935
 Teresina : 1935
 Dardanella : 1936
 Morucha : 1936
  : 1936
  : 1937
 Madiana : 1937
 Amapola : 1937
  : 1938
 Rumba Tambah : 1938
 La Cumparsita : 1939
 La Seine : 1952
 My Shawl : 1952
 Romance : 1953
 Maria la O : 1959
 Adieu : 1959
  : 1960
  : 1982
  : 1993

Albums 
  : 1971
 Noriko Awaya 50th Anniversary : 1978 album including song "Charmaine"
 Last Song : 1982
  : 1988
  : 1993
  : 2000 – Triple-CD greatest-hits album set just after her death
  : 2003 compilation
  : 2004 compilation
  : 2005 compilation
  : 2007 compilation
 Golden Best Noriko Awaya: Chanson Album : 2009 compilation
  : 2010 compilation

Kōhaku Uta Gassen appearances

References

1907 births
1999 deaths
Japanese sopranos
People from Aomori (city)
Musicians from Aomori Prefecture
20th-century Japanese women singers
20th-century Japanese singers